Kolangal may refer to:

Kolangal (1981 film), a Malayalam film directed by K. G. George
Kolangal (1995 film), a Tamil film directed by I. V. Sasi
Kolangal (TV series), a serial starring Devayani